Coleg Menai (meaning: Menai College) is a further education college located in Bangor, Gwynedd, Wales. The college also has campuses in Parc Menai, Llangefni, Caernarfon and Holyhead.

The college provides a range of academic and vocational courses including A levels, Apprenticeships, English for Speakers of Other Languages programmes and Access courses. It also offers some higher education courses in conjunction with Bangor University, Glyndŵr University and the University of South Wales.

On 2 April 2012, Coleg Menai and Coleg Llandrillo Cymru (which included Coleg Meirion-Dwyfor) merged to create Grwp Llandrillo Menai, the largest further education institute in Wales.

Notable alumni
 Matthew Dent, designer
 Nathan Gill, UK Independence Party and Brexit Party MEP
 Owain Tudur Jones, footballer
Cassia Pike, footballer

References

External links

 Coleg Menai - Grwp Llandrillo Menai

Bangor, Gwynedd
Llangefni
Caernarfon
Further education colleges in Anglesey
Further education colleges in Gwynedd